100 Demons is American hardcore band 100 Demons' self-titled second album. 

Again, produced by Chris "Zeuss" Harris, and released on the label Deathwish Inc. in 2004. A heavier album at times, yet employing clean singing into their sound along with their brand of hardcore on certain songs. The guitar riffs are also vastly more varied, adding metalcore to their existing hardcore punk sound featured on In the Eyes of the Lord (2000). 

Track 9 is a re-recording, previously released on the compilation album A Breed Apart: Outside Looking In released in the year 2000, on NGS Records

Track listing

References

2004 albums
100 Demons albums
Deathwish Inc. albums
Albums with cover art by Jacob Bannon
Albums produced by Chris "Zeuss" Harris